Chiang Nien-hsin 江念欣 (born April 29, 1997) is a Taiwanese weightlifter, from Taoyuan District, Kaohsiung, a Mountain Indigenous District. 

A member of the Bunun people, she has won several international medals, including gold at the 2014 Youth Olympics and bronzes at Weightlifting at the 2017 Summer Universiade – Women's 63 kg and the 2017 Asian Weightlifting Championships. She will compete at the 2020 Olympics. Her best result at the World Weightlifting Championships is 8th, at the 2017 World Weightlifting Championships – Women's 63 kg.

She represented Chinese Taipei at the 2020 Summer Olympics in Tokyo, Japan. She competed in the women's 55 kg event, finishing thirteenth.

References

External links
 

1997 births
Living people
Taiwanese female weightlifters
Medalists at the 2017 Summer Universiade
Universiade medalists in weightlifting
Universiade bronze medalists for Chinese Taipei
Weightlifters at the 2014 Summer Youth Olympics
Youth Olympic gold medalists for Chinese Taipei
Weightlifters at the 2020 Summer Olympics
Olympic weightlifters of Taiwan
21st-century Taiwanese women